Lough Scur is a freshwater lake in south County Leitrim, northwest Ireland. It is part of the Shannon–Erne Waterway. There have been Human settlements here since the New Stone Age. Modern features include quays and moorings. Protected features are Castle John, three Crannogs, and the causeway into Rusheen Island, though "Jail Island" is not protected. The ecology of Lough Scur, and indeed all county Leitrim lakes, is threatened by pollution and invasive species such as curly waterweed, zebra mussel, and freshwater clam.

Etymology
Fanciful folklore of the 19th century claimed Lough Scur was named from Oscar son of Oisín, and his grave lay at Aghascur, "the field of the Scur". However, it is pointed out the word "Scur" has various meanings, and probably translates to "". O’Donovan suggests 'Scuir' means "", and the  suggests Lough Scuir means "the lake of the horses, pasturage, troop".

Geography

Lough Scur is deep with generally a soft mud or compact peat bottom, the shallowest portion is the northern reach, between Driny and Drumcong, probably due to the large quantity of detritus carried into it by a mountain stream at Kiltubrid townland. Lough Marrave might be considered a continuation of Lough Scur, as they share the same level and connected by a half-mile channel. Carrickaport Lough drains into Lough Scur by a  stream running through Drumcong townland. Drumaleague Lough, lying  to the south west, is connected via the Shannon–Erne Waterway. Sub-glacial Rogen moraine landforms are evident in the valley between Slieve Anierin and Lough Scur, caused by ice age glaciers moving northeast to southwest over millions of years, the Morainic drift heaping up thousands of drumlins in the surrounding lowlands.

Ecology
Fish present in Lough Scur include "roach-bream hybrids" (54%), Roach (22%), Perch (9%), Bream (9%, including. Skimmers), Pike (6%), nine-spine stickleback, and Eel. The large proportion of hybrids results from the Pike here preferring Roach (86%), Stickleback (9%), and Perch (4%) in their overall diet. The pike population is the "native Irish strain" ( meaning 'Irish Pike') not the other European Pike strain ( meaning 'strange or foreign fish'). Large pike have been caught here weighing  or more. When surveyed in 2002, no zebra mussels were reported at the highest water level, and  the water quality was rated as mesotrophic.

Demography

Canal
Lough Scur forms part of the Shannon–Erne Waterway, lying at the summit of the canal connecting Lough Scur to the River Shannon, just south of Leitrim village. The original canal was constructed in the 1840s, fell into decline as the rail network prospered, but was reopened in 1994 to develop the region's tourism industry. The levels of Lough Scur are controlled by Waterways Ireland via two Spillways. The recording of large numbers of ancient dug-out canoes from county Leitrim remind us that waterways have always been a key means of transport in Ireland.

Villages
The primary human settlements at Lough Scur are the villages of Keshcarrigan and Drumcong.

Historical heritage

Stone Age
Mesolithic hunter-gatherers may have frequented Lough Scur sometime . Archaeological finds from Lough Scur include five Lithic flakes, a polished shale axe, a dolerite axe roughout, and a piece of leather under a dugout canoe. The leather and canoe are not dated, but the flakes are probably Mesolithic.

Raftery (1957) claimed small Stone Age crannogs were observed at Lough Scur. The pre-Bronze Age material were described as flat, circular sites of stones, 6-10m in diameter and 400 cm above the lake mud. The interiors often consisted of brushwood, irregularly sized stones and sometimes horizontal timbers, some charred. Charred animal bones were found on the surface,  indicating swine (wild boar, domestic pig) and oxen were part of the diet.

Bronze Age

There was a Bronze Age human settlement at Lough-Scur . The "" is an triangular coarse block of white sandstone found on the Lough-Scur crannog, bearing matrices for casting Copper and Bronze flat axes or spear-heads, and containing three moulds, one flat axe and one looped Palstave on obverse, with one flat axe on reverse. These were fashioned before the lake dwellers became familiar with the use of Iron sourced from Sliabh an Iarainn for example. The illustration shows the side with moulds for a plain Celt (tool)  and for a Celt  with cross strop and ring. The mould is part of the Royal Irish Academy's Collection.

Iron Age
Lough Scur contains five or six crannogs (artificial lake dwellings). Pre-Celtic archaeological remains from Lough Scur are preserved by the Royal Irish Academy museum and National Museum of Ireland-
 Five Lithic flakes, shale axe, dolerite axe roughout, piece of leather.
 The .
 The , perhaps the largest example in Ireland, discovered on the crannog.
 The Kiltubrid Shield discovered on Kiltubrid townland nearby Lough Scur.
 The Keshcarrigan Bowl discovered in the canal between Lough Scur and Lough Marrave.
 Approximately one cask of bones found on Lough Scur crannog.

Aghascur Druid's Altar

An ancient stone monument, probably a Druids Altar, is prominently located 400 yards south of the lake in a sloping pasture anciently named . Set against the spectacular backdrop of Lough Scur and Slieve Anierin, it is marked "Dermot and Grania's Bed" on some maps. Although two erect stones at the south have certainly been artificially set upright, this anomalous monument is extremely doubtful and, on the evidence, cannot be accepted as a megalithic tomb, but rather an attempt to split a rock outcrop from underlying bedrock. It may have been a Druids altar before Christianity. There is also a Cist located here.

Castle O'Connor
In 1265AD, Aedh mac Felim Ó Conchobair constructed a fortified "castle" at Loch Scur. Defending the Conmhaícne of Muintir Eolais from Norman conquest was a military objective, and  his Lough Scur regiment and Conmhaicne forces both participated in the decisive Battle of Áth an Chip.

Castle of Lough Scur
Crannogs occurred at Lough Scur through the Middle Ages, and the Irish Annals allude to a fortified crannog at Lough Scur.

 "1346: .
 "1390: 

In the 19th century, a portion of a heavy oak-frame, with mortices and cheeks cut into it, was found on a crannog here.

Castle Sean

 Sean Reynolds built a 'Castle' at Gowly townland on a peninsula called Castle Island. Castle John was three stories high and surrounded by good rock land. Between  Castle Sean was residence to Sean Reynolds (d. 1619), Humphrey his son (d. 1661), Sean his grandson (captured and probably executed during the Irish Rebellion of 1641) and another grandson James (d. 1729),  who probably abandoned the Castle during his lifetime. Dilapidated ruins of Castle Sean remain today, but are not preserved as national monument, tourist, or heritage site. Some of the building collapsed  but was repaired by a heritage preservation society.

Prison Island
On 6 April 1605, Sean and his son Humphrey were appointed gaoler of county Leitrim. They constructed a 'prison' on 'Jail island' in Lough Scur. The jail cells were small with holes about six inches in diameter for air. Tradition recalls many people being hanged on the island, and that Sean was killed by a soldier from Longford avenging his sister's death there.  Prison Island was abandoned once Carrick-on-Shannon gaol became established. Dilapidated ruins of the prison remain but are not preserved for heritage.

Metalworking tradition
A tradition of metalworking at Lough Scur is recorded. Five Metalsmiths from "Lougheskure" obtained grants of pardons in the Elizabethan Fiants .

 Gilla Gruma O'Flynn.
 Charles O'Flynn.
 Toole O'Fenane.
 Teige oge O'Fonan and Eoin O'Finan, named as Tinker metal workers.

Book of Lough Scur
In the early 20th century, a book or manuscript titled the "Book of Lough Scur", on the Reynolds family, supposedly existed in the library of an unidentified deceased person living near Keshcarrigan, co. Leitrim.

"Book of LoughScur - A book or manuscript bearing this title, on the Reynolds family (ancient name MacRannal or Magrannal), co. Leitrim, was heard of about three years ago in the neighbourhood of Keshcarrigan, co. Leitrim, as having been seen in the library of a gentleman who had died a little while previously; but his name was not ascertained. Materials are being collected for a history of the Reynolds family, and information regarding this book or the loan of it would be much appreciated. [June 1st 1905]".

[text: query from [Henry F. Reynolds, 93, Denbigh Street, S.W.]

"I have never heard of the 'Book of Lough- scur,' but if it be in existence, it will probably be found either in Trinity College or the Royal Irish Academy, Dublin." [21 Oct 1905]
 
[text:  response from [Baron Seton of Andria]

See also
List of loughs in Ireland
The Keshcarrigan Bowl
Kiltubrid Shield

References and notes

Notes

Citations

Sources

External links 

Scur
Archaeological sites in County Leitrim
Megalithic monuments in Ireland
Castles in County Leitrim
Places of Conmaicne Maigh Nissi